Parth (foaled 1920) was a British-trained Thoroughbred racehorse best known for winning the 1923  Prix de l'Arc de Triomphe.

Background
Parth was a bay horse sired by Polymelus, the five-time Leading sire in Great Britain & Ireland. His dam was Willia, a daughter of the 1902 Ascot Gold Cup winner William the Third. As a descendant of the mare Grand Duchess, Parth was a member of the same Thoroughbred family which produced Manna, Blushing Groom and Mill Reef.

Parth was first owned by the Indian textile magnate Mathradas Goculdas and later sold for 20,000 guineas to A. Kingsley Macomber, an American who maintained a sizeable racing operation in Europe and who had won the 1918 Preakness Stakes with War Cloud. The colt was trained at Ogbourne in Wiltshire, England by James H. Crawford.

Racing career
In 1923 Parth contested The Derby having previously won the Greenham Plate at Newbury: in both races he was ridden by the Australian jockey A. C. Walker. According to press reports, he was left twenty lengths behind the leaders at the start of the Derby, before staying on strongly in the straight to finish third behind Papyrus and Pharos. He later finished fourth in the St. Leger Stakes to the filly Tranquil. In October, Parth was sent to Paris to contest the fourth running of the Prix de l'Arc de Triomphe a race which, while an important international test, had not yet attained the status of Europe's premier weight-for-age contest. After arriving in France at Boulogne, Parth spent thirty hours travelling by train to Paris. Ridden by Frank O'Neill, Parth started at odds of 35/4 and won by a neck from Massine, a French-trained three-year-old who went on to win the race (as well as the Ascot Gold Cup) in 1924.

Racing at age four, Parth's wins included the Great Jubilee Handicap at Kempton Park Racecourse in May in which he defeated Verdict (winner of the Cambridgeshire Handicap and the Coronation Cup) by a short head. In Autumn he ran second to Pharos in the Champion Stakes at Newmarket and third behind the filly Teresina and Papyrus in the Jockey Club Stakes. Parth injured a tendon during the running for the City and Suburban Handicap and was retired in May 1925 to Macomber's stud farm in Normandy.

Stud record
Kingsley Macomber purchased Haras du Quesnay breeding farm in Lower Normandy from William Kissam Vanderbilt and for the 1925 breeding season Parth was retired to stand at stud. As a sire, he met with limited success but did produce Davout, a winner of the 1936 Poule d'Essai des Poulains.

Pedigree

Parth was inbred 3 × 3 to Hampton, meaning that this stallion appears twice in the third generation of his pedigree.

References

1920 racehorse births
Racehorses bred in the United Kingdom
Racehorses trained in the United Kingdom
Arc winners
Thoroughbred family 22-d